The W.P. Mills House, also known as Cushing House, Longenbaugh House and Island House, is a historic house at 1 Maksoutoff Street in Sitka, Alaska.  It occupies a prominent site in Sitka, located on a small island in the harbor at the end of a  causeway.  The house is located on the site where, during the Russian period in the early nineteenth century, a salt-making operation was located.  In 1915, W. P. Mills, son of one of the former American owners of the saltery after the Alaska Purchase, hired Seattle-based architect Louis L. Mendal to design a house to stand on the old saltery's foundation.  The design, which used the foundation as well as the massive wooden door of the saltery, adapted the foundation to provide a sheltered and private courtyard space, and to take advantage of the expansive views available.

The house was listed on the National Register of Historic Places in 1977.

See also
National Register of Historic Places listings in Sitka City and Borough, Alaska

References

Houses on the National Register of Historic Places in Alaska
Houses completed in 1916
Houses in Sitka, Alaska
Buildings and structures on the National Register of Historic Places in Sitka, Alaska